The 2005 Badminton World Cup was the twentieth edition of an international tournament Badminton World Cup. The event was held at the Olympic Sports Park in Yiyang, Hunan, China from 14 to 18 December 2005. It was sanctioned by the International Badminton Federation and Table Tennis and Badminton Administration Center under China's State General Administration of Sport, with a total prize money of US$250,000. This was the first time after 1997, this tournament was being conducted. Between 1997 and 2005, this tournament was halted due to various problems. In the end of the competitions, China won the titles in all 5 disciplines.

Medallists

Men's singles

Finals

Women's singles

Finals

Men's doubles

Finals

Women's doubles

Finals

Mixed doubles

Finals

References 

Badminton World Cup
2005 in badminton
Yiyang
2005 in Chinese sport
Sport in Hunan
International sports competitions hosted by China
Badminton tournaments in China